Samson Sabit Wanni (born 1946) is a Sudanese weightlifter. He competed in the men's bantamweight event at the 1972 Summer Olympics.

References

1946 births
Living people
Sudanese male weightlifters
Olympic weightlifters of Sudan
Weightlifters at the 1972 Summer Olympics
Place of birth missing (living people)